The Kazakhstan national basketball team represents Kazakhstan in basketball international competitions. They belong to the FIBA Asia zone.

History
Kazakhstan's best finish in international competition was in the 2002 Asian Games, beating the Philippines in the bronze medal game, and a fourth-place finish in the FIBA Asia Championship 2007 losing out to Korea in the third-place game. At 2014 Asian Games, Kazakhstan end up on a 4th place after losing to Japan in third place match.

Competitions

FIBA Asia Cup

Asian Games

Team

Current roster

2021 FIBA Asia Cup qualification
Opposition: Palestine (21 February)
Venue: Saryarka Velodrome, Nur-Sultan
Opposition: Jordan (24 February)
Venue: Saryarka Velodrome, Nur-Sultan

Past roster

2021 FIBA Asia Cup qualification
Opposition: Palestine (21 February)
Venue: Saryarka Velodrome, Nur-Sultan
Opposition: Jordan (24 February)
Venue: Saryarka Velodrome, Nur-Sultan

Roster for the 2017 FIBA Asia Cup.

Depth chart

Head coach position
  Vitaliy Strebkov – 2005–2009
  Vadim Burakov – 2010
 Matteo Boniciolli – 2012–2013
  Vitaliy Strebkov – 2014–2015
 Eduard Skrypets – 2016–2017
 Mikhail Karpenko – 2017–2018
 Renatas Kurilionokas – 2018–

Notable players
Other current notable players from Kazakhstan:

|}

Legend
Club – describes current club 
Age – describes age on 12 March 2018
|}

Past rosters
Roster for the 2015 FIBA Asia Championship:
Head coach:  Vitaliy Strebkov

Kit

Sponsor
2015: ISKER

See also
Kazakhstan national under-17 basketball team
Kazakhstan national under-19 basketball team
Kazakhstan women's national basketball team

References

External links
Official website
FIBA profile

Videos
 Jordan v Kazakhstan - Group F - Game Highlights - 2015 FIBA Asia Championship Youtube.com video

 
 
Men's national basketball teams
1992 establishments in Kazakhstan